MSN (meaning Microsoft Network) is a web portal and related collection of Internet services and apps for Windows and mobile devices, provided by Microsoft and launched on August 24, 1995, alongside the release of Windows 95.

The Microsoft Network was initially a subscription-based dial-up online service that later became an Internet service provider named MSN Dial-up. At the same time, the company launched a new web portal named Microsoft Internet Start and set it as the first default home page of Internet Explorer, its web browser. In 1998, Microsoft renamed and moved this web portal to the domain name www.msn.com, where it has remained.

In addition to its original MSN Dial-up service, Microsoft has used the 'MSN' brand name for a wide variety of products and services over the years, notably Hotmail (later Outlook.com), Messenger (which was once synonymous with 'MSN' in Internet slang and has now been replaced by Skype), and its web search engine, which is now Bing, and several other rebranded and discontinued services.

The current website and suite of apps offered by MSN was first introduced by Microsoft in 2014 as part of a complete redesign and relaunch. MSN is based in the United States and offers international versions of its portal for dozens of countries around the world.

History

Microsoft Internet Start 

From 1995 to 1998, the MSN.com domain was used by Microsoft primarily to promote MSN as an online service and Internet service provider. At the time, MSN.com also offered a custom start page and an Internet tutorial, but Microsoft's major web portal was known as "Microsoft Internet Start", and was located at home.microsoft.com.

Internet Start served as the default home page for Internet Explorer and offered basic information such as news, weather, sports, stocks, entertainment reports, links to other websites on the Internet, articles by Microsoft staff members, and software updates for Windows. Microsoft's original news website, https://msnbc.com (now NBCNews.com), which launched in 1996, was also tied closely to the Internet Start portal.

MSN.com 
In 1998, the largely underutilized 'MSN.com' domain name was combined with Microsoft Internet Start and reinvented as both a web portal and as the brand for a family of sites produced inside Microsoft's Interactive Media Group. The new website put MSN in direct competition with sites such as Yahoo!, Excite, and Go Network. Because the new format opened up MSN's content to the world for free, the Internet service provider and subscription service were renamed to MSN Internet Access at that time. (That service eventually became known as MSN Dial-up.)

The relaunched MSN.com contained a whole family of sites, including original content, channels that were carried over from 'web shows' that were part of Microsoft's MSN 2.0 experiment with its Internet service provider in 1996–97, and new features that were rapidly added. MSN.com became the successor to the default Internet Explorer start page, as all of the previous 'Microsoft Internet Start' website was merged with MSN.com.

Some of the original websites that Microsoft launched during that era remain active in some form today. Microsoft Investor, a business news and investments service that was once produced in conjunction with CNBC, is now MSN Money; CarPoint, an automobile comparison and shopping service, is now MSN Autos; and the Internet Gaming Zone, a website offering online casual games, is now MSN Games. Other websites since divested by Microsoft include the travel website Expedia, the online magazine Slate, and the local event and city search website Sidewalk.com.

In the late 1990s, Microsoft collaborated with many other service providers, as well as other Microsoft departments, to expand the range of MSN's services. Some examples include MSN adCenter, MSN Shopping (affiliated with eBay, PriceGrabber and Shopping.com), and the Encarta encyclopedia with various levels of access to information.

Since then, MSN.com has remained a popular destination, launching many new services and content sites. MSN's Hotmail and Messenger services were promoted from the MSN.com portal, which provided a central place for all of MSN's content. MSN Search (now Bing), a dedicated search engine, launched in 1999. The single sign-in service for Microsoft's online services, Microsoft Passport (now Microsoft account), also launched across all MSN services in 1999. The MSN.com portal and related group of services under the 'MSN' umbrella remained largely the same in the early 2000s.

The sports section of the MSN portal was ESPN.com from 2001 to 2004, and FoxSports.com from 2004 to 2014. MSN had an exclusive partnership with MSNBC.com for news content from 1996 until 2012, when Microsoft sold its remaining stake in msnbc.com to NBCUniversal and the website was renamed NBCNews.com. Since then, MSN has launched 'MSN News', an in-house news operation.

As of May 2005, MSN.com was the second most visited portal websites in the United States with a share of 23.2 percent, behind Yahoo! which held a majority.

MSN released a preview of an updated home page and logo on November 3, 2009. It was originally expected to be widely available to over 100 million U.S. customers by early 2010. MSN rolled out the newer logo, together with a redesign of the overall website, on December 25, 2009.

In 2012, MSN announced on its blog that it would be unveiling a new version of the MSN.com home page on October 26, exclusively for Windows 8, saying that the new version would be "clean, simple, and built for touch". Microsoft said it would be more app-like due to the speed of Internet Explorer 10. More new features included 'Flip Ahead', which allowed users to swipe from one article to the next. MSN for Windows 8 also had new deals with the AP and Reuters.

Rebranding of services 

Many of MSN's services were reorganized in 2005 and 2006 under a new brand name that Microsoft championed at the time, Windows Live. This move was part of Microsoft's strategy to improve its online offerings using the Windows brand name. The company also overhauled its online software and services due to increasing competition from rivals such as Yahoo! and Google. The new name was introduced one service at a time. The group of Windows Live services used Web 2.0 technology to offer features and functionality through a web browser that were traditionally only available through dedicated software programs.

Some of the MSN services affected by the rebranding included MSN Hotmail, which became Windows Live Hotmail (now Outlook.com); MSN Messenger, which became Windows Live Messenger (now integrated into Skype); MSN Search, which became Live Search (now known as Bing); MSN Virtual Earth, which became Live Search Maps (now Bing Maps); MSN Spaces, which became Windows Live Spaces; MSN Alerts, which became Windows Live Alerts; and MSN Groups, which became Windows Live Groups. Some other services, such as MSN Direct, remained a part of the MSN family without transitioning to Windows Live.

Following the launch of Windows Live, the MSN brand took on a different focus. MSN became primarily an online content provider of news, entertainment, and common interest topics through its web portal, MSN.com, while Windows Live provided most of Microsoft's online software and services. In 2012, Microsoft began to phase out the Windows Live brand, referring to each service separately by its individual brand name without any 'Windows' prefix or association.

Subsequent redesign 
Microsoft launched a completely rewritten and redesigned MSN website, making use of the company's modern design language, on September 30, 2014. The new MSN portal features a new version of the logo that follows a style similar to other current Microsoft products. The website no longer offers original content, instead of employing editors to repurpose existing content from partners at popular and trusted organizations. Much of the existing content on MSN was eliminated as the website was simplified into a new home page and categories, some of which have corresponding apps:

 News: The latest news headlines and articles from a variety of hand-picked sources. Synced with the News app.
 Weather: Current weather conditions, forecasts, maps, news, and traffic. Synced with the Weather app.
 Entertainment: TV, movies, music, and celebrity news, as well as theater showtimes, tickets, and TV listings. Based on the former Bing Entertainment service. Also includes the MSN Games website for online casual games.
 Sports: Up-to-the-minute scores, standings, and headlines from leagues worldwide. Synced with the Sports app.
 Money: Stock market tickers and watchlists, personal finance, real estate, investments, currency converter, and more. Synced with the Money app.
 Lifestyle: Headlines, features, and other content related to style, home & garden, family, smart living, relationships, and horoscopes.
 Health & Fitness: Tools and information about weight loss, strength, exercise, nutrition, medicine, and more.
 Food & Drink: Recipes, cooking tips, news from chefs, cocktails, and shopping lists.
 Travel: Destinations, trip ideas, hotel search, flight search, flight status, and arrivals and departures. Previously based on Farecast.
 Autos: Research and buying advice, auto-related news, information for enthusiasts, and coverage of auto shows worldwide.
 Video: Trending and viral videos, comedy and pop culture, and videos from other MSN categories. Integrates with video search from Bing Videos.

The top of the home page provides access to Microsoft services Bing, Outlook.com, Skype, Office Online, OneNote, OneDrive, Bing Maps, and Groove Music, as well as popular social media services Facebook and Twitter. Signing into MSN with a Microsoft account allows for personalized content to appear and to be synchronized across devices on the website and in the corresponding apps. The redesign of the website led to the closure of MSN's longtime personalized home page service 'My MSN', which was made up of customized RSS feeds, as the new website no longer supports user-specified RSS content. However, it added some customizability, allowing each category on the home page to be reordered or hidden.

With the 2014 relaunch, MSN now supports responsive design and eliminates the need for a separate mobile website. The redesign of MSN proved positive and helped increase traffic with an additional 10 million daily visitors after two months.

Apps 

The MSN web-based apps provides users information from sources that publish to MSN.

Microsoft launched these apps along with the 2014 redesign of the MSN web portal, rebranding many of the Bing apps that originally shipped with Windows and Windows Phone. News, Weather, Sports, Money, and Travel first shipped with Windows 8, while Health & Fitness and Food & Drink first appeared in Windows 8.1. In December 2014, the apps became available across all the other major mobile device platforms as well: iOS, Android, and Fire OS.

The apps allow users a reasonable amount of freedom to decide which sources provide information. Each app has its own color code that is used on the live tile and internally. Originally, each app brought a unified experience with the MSN website and synchronized preferences across devices.

There are currently four apps in the suite: Start (previously News), Weather, Sports, and Money. In July 2015, Microsoft announced the discontinuation of the Food & Drink, Health & Fitness, and Travel apps on all platforms, and that they will not be bundled with Windows 10; those three apps are no longer offered.

After Microsoft's acquisition of Nokia's mobile phone division, Microsoft also started bundling MSN services with its Nokia-branded feature phones, though the only supported model was the Nokia 215. In addition to these apps, Microsoft developed a separate set of mobile apps specifically for MSN China.

Microsoft Start 

Microsoft Start (previously named Microsoft News, MSN News and Bing News) is a news aggregator and service that features news headlines and articles chosen by editors. The app includes sections for top stories, U.S., world, money, technology, entertainment, opinion, sports, and crime, along with other miscellaneous stories. It allows users to set their own personalized favorite topics and sources, receive notifications of breaking news through alerts, filter preferred news sources, and alter font sizes to make articles easier to read.

Originally, Start included an RSS feed, but that capability was removed; Microsoft currently only allows users to subscribe to specified news sources, thereby curating news. Start uses the chaseable live tile feature introduced in the Windows 10 Anniversary Update. If a user clicks on the Microsoft News Start menu tile when a particular story is shown, the user will see a link to that story at the top of the app when it launches.

Weather 
MSN Weather (originally named Bing Weather) shows weather from a user's current location or any other location worldwide, and it allows users to define their favorite places, which will synchronize back to the Microsoft Start and across devices. Users can pin Weather tiles to the Start menu to see local weather conditions from multiple locations at a glance. It also offers satellite maps and has information regarding ski resorts. The app receives its weather conditions and forecasts from a variety of sources internationally. Weather uses weather conditions as the background, making it the only app that does not have a light/dark switch in Windows 10. Weather is not available for iOS; however, it comes preinstalled on the Nokia 215 phone from Microsoft Mobile that runs Series 30+; it is currently the only feature phone to have the app built-in.

Money 
MSN Money (originally MoneyCentral, then MSN Moneycentral, before being rebranded as MSN Money in the mid-2000s - prior to being relaunched as a spin-off of Bing Finance) allows users to set up lists of stocks to watch, follow certain corporations and receive stock updates, get the latest headlines regarding stock markets, view real-time trading figures with a 30-minute delay, track their own personal finances, calculate mortgages, get information on commodities and bonds, and convert currency.

E-sports Hub 
MSN Esports (often referred to as MSN Esports Hub) is a Bing intelligence AI curated webpage for the growing esports industry. users can watch integrated streams from YouTube or Twitch. Microsoft's advanced AI called "Watch For" the algorithm originally made for Microsoft's Mixer is an artificial intelligence that uses Computer vision algorithms on livestreams so that it can alert the viewer of significant moments, this algorithm is implemented in the MSN esport hub. Users can also check the calendar for dates of upcoming e-sport events and tournaments or the news for updates on games and their tournament. After the creation of MSN's esport hub Microsoft acquired Smash.gg; an esport tournament platform.

Discontinued apps

Food & Drink 
MSN Food & Drink (originally named Bing Food & Drink) is a discontinued recipe app that offers news related to food and drink, a personal shopping list that synchronizes across devices and the web, and a wine encyclopedia that contains information on over 1.5million bottles of wine, over 3.3million tasting notes, and hundreds of cocktail recipes. Users can control the app hands-free, add their own recipes from physical cookbooks or personal recipes by snapping a photo, add notes to recipes, and sort the recipes into collections. The app also collects information from famous chefs and lists them according to their style of cuisine.

Health & Fitness 
MSN Health & Fitness (originally named Bing Health & Fitness) allowed users to track their intake of calories, look up nutritional information for hundreds of thousands of different foods, use a built-in GPS tracker, view step-by-step workouts and exercises with images and videos, check symptoms for various health conditions, and synchronize their health data to third-party devices such as activity trackers. MSN Health & Fitness formerly connected data with the Microsoft HealthVault, but it started using a Microsoft account with MSN's own cloud service to synchronize data when it was rebranded from Bing to MSN. The app is not related in any way to Microsoft's Xbox Fitness or Microsoft Health (the companion app for the Microsoft Band), despite being similar in function.

Sports 
MSN Sports (originally named Bing Sports) displayed various sports scores and standings from hundreds of leagues around the world, as well as aggregated sports-related articles and news headlines. Sports also allowed the user to view slideshows and photo galleries, look up information about individual players and fantasy leagues, and set and track their favorite teams by selecting various topics from the hamburger menu. It also powered various predictive features within Microsoft's Cortana virtual assistant.

It was discontinued on July 20, 2021, in favor of the web portal.

Travel 
MSN Travel (originally named Bing Travel) was a travel search engine that allows users to book hotels and flights, aggregates travel-related headlines, and offers detailed information about thousands of travel destinations. Data in the app is powered by various travel websites, including Expedia, formerly owned by Microsoft. Other features include finding information on local restaurants, viewing pictures (including panoramas) and historical data about destinations, and reading reviews by previous travelers. If the user is signed in, Cortana can track flights and get hotel information through the app. MSN Travel was the only app in the suite that was exclusive to Windows. The app was discontinued in September 2015 but can still be accessed via the web.

Previously, Microsoft had acquired Farecast in 2008, a website in the computer reservations system industry that offered predictions regarding the best time to purchase airline tickets. Farecast was founded in 2003 and collected over 175 billion airfare observations by 2007. Farecast's team of data miners used these airfare observations to build algorithms to predict future airfare price movements. Microsoft integrated it as part of its Live Search group of tools in May 2008 as Live Search Farecast; Microsoft rebranded it as Bing Travel on June 3, 2009, as part of its efforts to create a new search identity. In 2009, there were allegations that Bing Travel had copied its layouts from Kayak.com; Microsoft denied the allegations. By January 2013, Bing Travel results were powered by Kayak.com. As of January 2014, the fare prediction feature had been removed. As of May 2015, Microsoft rebranded the service to MSN Travel. In August 2015, MSN Travel flight search pages changed from being powered by Kayak.com to its competitor Skyscanner.

Older mobile apps 
Microsoft first offered content from its MSN web portal on mobile devices in the early 2000s, through a service called Pocket MSN (in line with its Pocket PC products of the era) and later renamed MSN Mobile. The original MSN Mobile software was preloaded on many cell phones and PDAs, and usually provided access to legacy MSN services like blogs (MSN Spaces), email (Hotmail), instant messaging (MSN Messenger), and web search (now called Bing). Some wireless carriers charged a premium to access it. As many former MSN properties were spun off to Bing, Windows Live, and other successors in the late 2000s, the Microsoft Mobile Services division took over the development of mobile apps related to those services.

In the meantime, Microsoft's MSN apps took on a more content-related focus,  as did the web portal itself. Previous versions of MSN apps that were bundled with Windows Mobile and early versions of Windows Phone, as well as MSN apps for Android and iOS devices in the early 2010s, were primarily repositories for news articles found on MSN.com. Other earlier MSN mobile apps included versions of MSN Weather and MSN Money for Windows Mobile 6.5, and 'MSN Money Stocks' and a men's magazine called 'MSN OnIt' for Windows Phone 7.

International 
Microsoft's world headquarters is in the United States, so the main MSN website is based there. However, MSN has offered various international versions of its portal since its inception in 1995 for dozens of countries around the world. A list of international MSN affiliates is available at MSN Worldwide.

Following the redesign and relaunch of the MSN web portal in 2014, most international MSN websites share the same layout as the U.S. website and are largely indistinguishable from it, aside from their content. There were two exceptions: ninemsn, a longtime partnership between Microsoft and the Nine Network in Australia that launched in 1997 (Microsoft sold its stake in the venture in 2013 and ended its co-branding with Nine in 2016); and MSN China, an entirely customized version of MSN for China (Microsoft discontinued the portal in 2016, replacing it with a page that links to a number of other Chinese websites).

See also 
 MSN Dial-up
 List of services by MSN
 Microsoft

References

External links 

 
 MSN Worldwide

 
Internet properties established in 1995
Microsoft websites
Web portals
Cross-platform software
Windows software
Windows Mobile software
Windows Phone software
IOS software
Android (operating system) software
News aggregators